Parramatta Park is a major urban park and historic site in Parramatta in Western Sydney, Australia. It was gazetted as a public park in 1858 on the site of the former Parramatta Government Domain over 99.5 hectares. It was gazetted as a National Park in 1917.

The park is a part of the territory of the Darug people, who called it Burramatta, and has remnants of the Cumberland Plain Woodland. It is historically and archaeologically significant and has been used for recreational purposes throughout the 19th and the 20th century. The remains of aboriginal occupation can be seen within the park and various artifacts of the era have been retrieved from the vast green space.

In 1860 the extension of the Main Western railway line divided the park and necessitated the demolition of Governor Macquarie's stables. In 1913 some of the park was annexed for the construction of Parramatta High School. In 1981, eight hectares was transferred to the Parramatta Stadium Trust.

In the early 1950s motor racing was held on the roads running through the park. After a failed attempt in 1938, in 1951 an agreement was reached between the Parramatta Park Trust and the Australian Sporting Car Club to build two circuits in the park; a full  Grand Prix circuit, and a shorter  club circuit. Initially the agreement was for four meetings per year, with the first on 28 January 1952, but in the end five were held that year, and in the final year of racing 12 were held in 1955. An attempt to revive the circuit failed in 1958 due to an intervention by the Commissioner of Police over safety concerns.

In June 1954, the Steam Tram & Railway Preservation Society laid a short section of railway track. Its depot was destroyed by an arson attack in June 1993, and the track was lifted in December 1998.

The present parklands are 85 hectares in size, straddling the Parramatta River on the western edge of the Parramatta central business district. Old Government House, sits within the park.

The park is administered by the Parramatta Park Trust pursuant to the Parramatta Park Trust Act 2001.

References

1858 establishments in Australia
Defunct motorsport venues in Australia
Main Western railway line, New South Wales
Parks in Sydney
Parramatta